Nap hand refers to a series of five winning points or five victories in a game or sport.

Possibly derived from the card game Nap or Napoleon.

See also
 Hat trick

References

Sports terminology